The USRC Miami  was purchased by the Revenue Cutter Service from Arthur Leary for $25,000 and was formerly the Lady Le Marchant, a 115-foot schooner-rigged steamer with a hull of teak planks over oak frames. After outfitting she was stationed briefly in Washington, D.C. 

After a transfer to New York City, she was tasked with escorting the captured Confederate steamer Chesapeake from Halifax, Nova Scotia to New York City on 15 March 1864. The Miami underwent repairs at Newport, Rhode Island after being transferred there in November, 1864. Additional repairs were done during 1867 at Staten Island and then she saw service out of Wilmington, Delaware until being sold to Mason, Hobbs & Co., Philadelphia, Pennsylvania for $2,149 on 19 April 1871.

Notes

Citations

References used

 
 
 

Ships of the United States Revenue Cutter Service